Infection is a bimonthly peer-reviewed medical journal published by Springer Science+Business Media. It covers research on infectious diseases, including etiology, pathogenesis, diagnosis, and treatment in outpatient and inpatient settings.

Types of articles 
The journal publishes original research articles, brief reports, review articles, and case reports.

Societies 
Infection is the official publication of the following societies:
German Society for Infectious Diseases
Paul Ehrlich Society
German Sepsis Society
Italian Society of Infectious and Tropical Diseases

In addition, the journal collaborates with:
European Society of Clinical Microbiology and Infectious Diseases
European Society of Chemotherapy Infectious Diseases
Swiss Society for Infectious Diseases

Abstracting and indexing 
The journal is abstracted and indexed in:

According to the Journal Citation Reports, the journal has a 2018 impact factor of 2. 3.553.

References

External links 
 

Microbiology journals
Bimonthly journals
Springer Science+Business Media academic journals
English-language journals
Publications established in 1973